AhlulBayt News Agency (abbreviated ABNA) is an Iranian online news aggregator based in Qom. It was launched on March 15, 2005, by authorities of the Ahl Al-Bayt World Assembly. Its coverage includes issues concerning Shiite communities in Asia, Africa, Europe, America and other parts of the world. It gained a large following during the Arab spring and was banned in Saudi Arabia and Bahrain for covering the regional protests.

History 
In the year 2005, to tackle with the problem of mass media covering Shiite communities in an unfair way, it was the secretary General of the Ahl Al-Bayt World Assembly who recognized that in order to fight this one-sidedness there should be an exclusive website that can fully dedicate its time and energy to make sure all Shiite communities remain aware of the developments around them. To help, under-reported communities rise, in that year, the first form of a primary Shia news outlet came into existence under the name Shianews.

In the summer of 2006, with an optimistic vision, the website received a professional management team to introduce it in a new interface which was more fitting and easy-to-use. At this point, more domains were also assigned for the site.

In August 2007 a new phase was kicked off due to the amount of attention the website gained, making it one of the most famous Shiite news websites on the net. At this moment, Shianews changed both its domain and title to AhlolBayt News Agency and Abna24.com, managing to speak to a wider range of visitors from some Arab and western countries that had restrictions with ir domain. Subsequently, and by the inauguration of President Mahmoud Ahmadinejad, ABNA became an official news agency operating in 20 (25 as of now) languages with full-time employees.

Agenda

People in ABNA are given the task to constantly observe the developments in Iraq, Syria, Nigeria and other areas where issues related to Shiite communities and often other minorities (including non-Shias) are unfolding. They report on them and let people share them via social media. They try to be equal in their approach.

Awards
ABNA is awarded many times during festivals in Iran. In 2012 ABNA won a prize for being the best online news agency from the 19th International Press Exhibition.

Authorizations
ABNA is licensed by the Ministry of Culture and Islamic Guidance (Iran) and is run by Sayyid Ali Reza Husseini as its managing director.

Languages
ABNA is already available in 25 languages including Urdu, Farsi, Turkish, English, Spanish, French, Chinese, Russian, German, Bengali, Azeri, Latin, Cyrillic, Indonesian, Hindi, Swahili, Malaysian, Bosnian, Burmese, and Hausa.

Headquarters
ABNA has two main offices, one in Qom and the other in Tehran.

See also

List of Iranian news agencies

References

External links
 Official website
 Join ABNA English on Telegram

Iranian news websites
News agencies based in Iran